Huanan County is a county of eastern Heilongjiang province, People's Republic of China. It is under the jurisdiction of the prefecture-level city of Jiamusi.

Administrative divisions 
Huanan County is divided into 7 towns and 5 townships. 
7 towns
 Tuoyaozi, Shitouhezi, Huanan, Tulongshan, Mengjiagang, Yanjia, Liumaohe
5 townships
 Jinsha, Lishu, Mingyi, Dabalang, Wudaogang

Demographics 

Climate

Notes and references

External links
  Government site - 

Huanan